Atriplex spongiosa, the pop saltbush (a name it shares with Atriplex holocarpa), is a species of flowering plant in the family Amaranthaceae, native to central Australia, and introduced to South Africa and Iran. A halophyte, it can grow in media having an NaCl concentration over 600 mM.

References

spongiosa
Halophytes
Endemic flora of Australia
Flora of the Northern Territory
Flora of Queensland
Flora of South Australia
Flora of New South Wales
Plants described in 1858